John Kyrle (22 May 1637 – 7 November 1724), known as "the Man of Ross", was an English philanthropist, remembered for his time in Ross-on-Wye in Herefordshire.

Education and legal background 

Born in the parish of Dymock, Gloucestershire, he was the son of Walter Kyrle, a barrister and MP. The family had lived at Ross for many generations. His grandfather, James Kyrle of Walford Court, had been High Sheriff of Herefordshire and whose father, Walter, had spelled the surname Crull which had been a common surname among the Norman aristocracy that had dominated England  and a name which gradually disappeared with the Anglo-French aristocracy's anglicisation. James Kyrle's wife, Ann, was the sister of  the poet Edmund Waller and her maternal uncle was the statesman John Hampden.

John Kyrle was educated at Balliol College, Oxford, matriculating in 1654. He then entered to study law at the Middle Temple in 1657, but was not called to the bar. He inherited the family  estate including a house overlooking the market at Ross, where he lived, following his father's death in 1650.

Philanthropy in Ross 

From his early twenties he adopted a frugal lifestyle and instead of utilising his wealth for himself, he sought to invest in the greater good of his locality and community that lived there.

In everything that concerned the welfare of the small town of Ross in which he lived he took a lively interest; in the education of the children and in improving and embellishing the town. He planted trees in and around the town, with two or three workmen to assist with the manual work. He delighted in mediating between those who had quarrelled and in preventing costly lawsuits between prominent townspeople. He was generous to the poor and spent all he had in good works.

He was behind the establishment of 'The Prospect' in Ross in 1700. The public garden on the hilltop just above Ross town centre was laid out with a viewpoint, walkways and a public fountain to provide clean water for town residents. The park is still there, alongside the churchyard of St Mary's , with ornate stone gates and mature trees interspersed with benches and a walk.

Kyrle lived a great deal in the open air, working with the labourers on his farm and taking exercise to stay healthy. He died on 7 November 1724, having lived to the age of 87, and was buried in the chancel of Ross Church.  His name is commemorated throughout Ross-on-Wye, not only in The Prospect but in the 'Man of Ross' public house on Wye Street  and his market square townhouse. The town's secondary school carries his name.

His memory was also preserved by the Kyrle Society, founded in 1876 by Miranda and Octavia Hill, to better the life of working people, by laying out parks, encouraging house decoration, window gardening and flower growing. The Society was one of the first civic amenity bodies and a progenitor of the National Trust.

Commemorated in verse 

Ross and John Kyrle were eulogised by Alexander Pope in the third of his Moral Essays "Of the Use of Riches" (1734);

Who taught that heav’n directed Spire to rise?
The Man of Ross, each lisping babe replies.
Behold the Market-place with poor o'erspread!
He feeds yon Alms-house, neat, but void of state,
Where Age and Want sit smiling at the gate;
Him portion’d maids, apprentic’d orphans blest,
The young who labour, and the old who rest.
Is any sick? the Man of Ross relieves,
Prescribes, attends, the med’cine makes, and gives,
Is there a variance? enter but his door,
Balk’d are the Courts, and contest is no more.
Despairing Quacks with curses fled the place,
And vile Attornies, now a useless race.

and by Coleridge in an early poem of 1794.

Bibliography
  The Social Milieu of Alexander Pope

References

External links
Article on Man of Ross of 1893
 John Kyrle
 Man of Ross
 D.O.B.

English philanthropists
Alumni of Balliol College, Oxford
People from Dymock
People from Ross-on-Wye
1637 births
1724 deaths